The Saffman–Taylor instability, also known as viscous fingering, is the formation of patterns in a morphologically unstable interface between two fluids in a porous medium, described mathematically by Philip Saffman and G. I. Taylor in a paper of 1958. This situation is most often encountered during drainage processes through media such as soils.  It occurs when a less viscous fluid is injected, displacing a more viscous fluid; in the inverse situation, with the more viscous displacing the other, the interface is stable and no instability is seen. Essentially the same effect occurs driven by gravity (without injection) if the interface is horizontal and separates two fluids of different densities, the heavier one being above the other: this is known as the Rayleigh-Taylor instability. In the rectangular configuration the system evolves until a single finger (the Saffman–Taylor finger) forms, whilst in the radial configuration the pattern grows forming fingers by successive tip-splitting.

Most experimental research on viscous fingering has been performed on Hele-Shaw cells, which consist of two closely spaced, parallel sheets of glass containing a viscous fluid. The two most common set-ups are the channel configuration, in which the less viscous fluid is injected at one end of the channel, and the radial configuration, in which the less viscous fluid is injected at the centre of the cell.  Instabilities analogous to viscous fingering can also be self-generated in biological systems.

Derivation for a planar interface 
The simplest case of the instability arises at a planar interface within a porous medium or Hele-Shaw cell, and was treated by Saffman and Taylor but also earlier by other authors. A fluid of viscosity  is driven in the -direction into another fluid of viscosity  at some velocity . Matching the pressure fields at the interface givesand so , leading to growth of the perturbation when  - i.e. when the injected fluid is less viscous than the ambient fluid. There are problems with this basic case: namely that the most unstable mode has infinite wavenumber  and grows at an infinitely fast rate, which can be rectified by the introduction of surface tension (which provides a jump condition in pressures across the fluid interface through the Young–Laplace equation), which has the effect of modifying the growth rate to

with surface tension  and  the mean curvature.

In radial geometry 
The Saffman–Taylor instability is usually seen in an axisymmetric context as opposed to the simple planar case derived above. The mechanisms for the instability remain the same in this case, and the selection of the most unstable wavenumber in this case corresponds to a given number of fingers (an integer).

See also
Kelvin–Helmholtz instability
Darcy's law

References

Fluid dynamics